The Eseniu is a small river in the Gurghiu Mountains, Harghita County, central Romania. It is a left tributary of the river Mureș. It flows through the village Sineu (municipality Remetea), and joins the Mureș in the village Remetea.

References

Rivers of Romania
Rivers of Harghita County